Die Tunisreise is a 2007 documentary film.

Synopsis 
This documentary connects two artistic trajectories belonging to two different eras. The former was done by Paul Klee, whose work was considerably influenced by his journey to Tunis, Tunisia, in 1914. The latter is done by the Tunisian filmmaker and painter Nacer Khemir, inspired by Klee's paintings. This film shows the connection between the possibilities offered by images and reveals the links between both artists. Nearly a hundred years after Paul Klee, Nacer Khemir retraces Paul Klee's footsteps in Tunisia, guiding the spectator into the rich history and culture of Tunisia

External links
 

2007 films
Austrian documentary films
Swazi documentary films
Tunisian documentary films
2007 documentary films
Documentary films about painters
Paul Klee